The Kuwait PSA Cup (previously called the Kuwait Open) is an annual men's squash tournament held in Kuwait City, Kuwait in November. It is part of the PSA World Series, the highest level of men's professional squash competition. The event was founded in 2004.

Past Results

References

External links

Squashsite page

Squash tournaments in Kuwait
Recurring sporting events established in 2004